Qədirli (also, Kadirli and Kadyrly) is a village and municipality in the Masally Rayon of Azerbaijan.  It has a population of 883.

References 

Populated places in Masally District